Qingnian Reservoir (may refer to:

 , in Mishan, Heilongjiang, China.

 , in Donggang, Liaoning, China. 

 , in Qingdao, Shandong, China.

 Qingnian Reservoir (Shaoshan), in Shaoshan, Hunan, China.

 , in Haifeng County, Guangdong, China. 

 , in Hengzhou, Guangxi, China.